Abdur Razzak Molla or Rezzak Mollah was Minister for Land and Land Reforms in the Left Front Ministry in the Indian state of West Bengal.

The son of Karim Bukhs Molla, a peasant who cultivated paddy and vegetables, he was attracted to the Communist movement while a college student and started his political career on the peasant front.

Abdur Razzak Molla was elected from the  Canning Purba seat from 1977 to 2011. He was one of the few ministers to retain his seat in the 2011 elections.

In February 2014, the CPI(M) West Bengal State Committee issued a note expelling Razzak Molla from the party for his anti-party activities. He formed a new political party- Bharatiya Naybichar Party (BNP) on Oct 18, 2014. However, Mollah was expelled from the BNP for establishing relationship with Mamata Banerjee and TMC in Jan 2016 and he joined hands with Trinamool Congress officially in Feb 2016.

He was made a candidate for the Trinamool Congress from Bhangar for the 2016 assembly elections.

References

1945 births
Living people
People from South 24 Parganas district
State cabinet ministers of West Bengal
Trinamool Congress politicians from West Bengal
West Bengal MLAs 1977–1982
West Bengal MLAs 1982–1987
West Bengal MLAs 1987–1991
West Bengal MLAs 1991–1996
West Bengal MLAs 1996–2001
West Bengal MLAs 2001–2006
West Bengal MLAs 2006–2011
West Bengal MLAs 2011–2016
West Bengal MLAs 2016–2021
Communist Party of India (Marxist) politicians from West Bengal